Danny Tse Wai Chun (born 30 January 1997) is a Hong Kong professional footballer who plays as a defender for Hong Kong Premier League club Rangers.

References

External links
Tse Wai Chun at HKFA
 

1997 births
Living people
Hong Kong footballers
Association football defenders
Hong Kong Rangers FC players
Yuen Long FC players
R&F (Hong Kong) players
Hong Kong Premier League players